Skyline Plaza may refer to:

 Skyline Plaza (Frankfurt)
 Skyline Plaza (Hong Kong)